FADE (or DEGRADE) is digital rights management software developed by Codemasters. FADE operates by checking whether a game has been pirated; if it has, it initially allows the game to run normally, but deliberately alters gameplay mechanics over time to make the game difficult, if not outright unplayable.

Operation 
FADE introduces deliberate errors in some of the sectors of the disc, which resemble the errors typically seen on scratched CDs and DVDs. When the disc is copied, the error-correction mechanism (both CDs and DVDs employ error-correction techniques) will notice the errors and automatically correct them.

When the game is launched, the game's executable looks for the  errors. If the errors are present, FADE will determine that the disc is a legal copy of the game. If the errors are not present, FADE will determine that the disc is a copy and that the game has been pirated. There is no notification or error message that tells the player that a fake disc image has been detected, which makes it very difficult for software crackers to determine if their crack has succeeded in defeating FADE.

Upon detecting a pirated copy, FADE gradually alters gameplay mechanics and core features to render the game extremely difficult, if not outright impossible, to play normally. The issues introduced by FADE are often designed to resemble glitches, or otherwise frustrate or surprise unsuspecting pirates, giving the impression that the game is simply bugged without revealing the true nature of the issue. Occasionally, the intention of FADE's implementation may also be to "out" pirates by tricking them into detailing their "game-breaking bug" on support forums, often resulting in the pirate being banned from the forum or, if possible, even the game itself.

The effects of FADE vary depending on the game it is implemented in. For example, in Arma 2, FADE gradually decreases the accuracy of the player's weapons, making it very difficult to hit a target, even at close range. FADE can also reverse the controls of vehicles, or make them randomly start and stop moving. Eventually, FADE will turn the player into a bird and display a message that reads "Good birds do not fly away from this game, you have only yourself to blame". However, not all FADE applications produce results this extreme; Take On Helicopters, which uses DEGRADE, simply blurs and warps the player's screen upon detecting a pirated game, making it extremely difficult to see clearly.

Applications 
Bohemia Interactive used FADE in all of their releases until Operation Flashpoint: Cold War Crisis, after which DEGRADE was used instead.

Serious Sam 3: BFE uses FADE by introducing overpowered or indestructible enemies in the zone.

References 

Compact Disc and DVD copy protection